The 1969 Pickens 200 was a NASCAR Grand National Series event that was held on June 21, 1969, at Greenville-Pickens Speedway in Greenville, South Carolina.

The transition to purpose-built racecars began in the early 1960s and occurred gradually over that decade.  Changes made to the sport by the late 1960s brought an end to the "strictly stock" vehicles of the 1950s.

Race report
25 drivers competed in this 200-lap racing event that took more than one hour and thirty minutes to successfully complete. Paul Dean Holt was credited with the last-place finish due to an engine problem on the first regulation lap of racing. Bobby Isaac would defeat David Pearson by nine seconds. Isaac, Pearson, and Richard Petty would be the only drivers on the lead lap by the end of the event after dominating the entire race.

James Hylton would compete directly against Nord Krauskopf as a NASCAR team owner for supremacy; Krauskopf's 1969 Dodge vehicle would prove to be superior to Hylton's 1967 Plymouth vehicle. The model year of the vehicles varied from 1967 to 1969 in compliance with NASCAR's regulations of that era. Cecil Gordon quit the race on lap 123 due to personal issues. Other notable drivers to appear at this race included: Neil Castles, J.D. McDuffie, Elmo Langley, Wendell Scott, and Bill Champion. Buster Sexton was black flagged during this race and was eventually disqualified on the ninth lap of the race.

Individual winnings for this race varied from a meager $200 ($ when adjusted for inflation) to an incredible $1,000 ($ when adjusted for inflation). The total prize purse for this racing event was $6,795 ($ when adjusted for inflation).

Notable crew chiefs that witnessed the race were John Hill, Dick Hutcherson, Dale Inman and Harry Hyde. These individuals helped provide pit road services for John Sears, David Pearson, Richard Petty and Bobby Isaac.

Qualifying

Top 10 finishers

Timeline
Section reference: 
 Start of race: Bobby Isaac had the pole position to begin the event with.
 Lap 1: Paul Dean Holt managed to blow his engine after barely competing in the race.
 Lap 9: Buster Sexton was black-flagged for something that he shouldn't have done and was disqualified.
 Lap 42: Dick Johnson managed to overheat his vehicle.
 Lap 45: A messed-up axle on Dick Poling's vehicle forced him to end his day early.
 Lap 46: Oil line issues made Wayne Gillette forget about winning the race.
 Lap 49: Problems with the car's steering caused Bill Seifert to end his race day early.
 Lap 62: John Sears' vehicle suffered from a terminal crash; forcing Sears to exit the race.
 Lap 67: David Pearson took over the lead from Bobby Isaac.
 Lap 68: Bobby Isaac took over the lead from David Pearson.
 Lap 107: David Pearson took over the lead from Bobby Isaac.
 Lap 109: Bobby Isaac took over the lead from David Pearson.
 Lap 123: Cecil Gordon apparently quit the race for no apparent reason.
 Lap 133: Transmission problems knocked Pete Hazelwood out of the race.
 Lap 145: A faulty axle caused Bill Champion to leave the race early.
 Lap 150: Jabe Thomas managed to lose the rear end of his vehicle, forcing him to accept 15th-place finish.
 Finish: Bobby Isaac was officially declared the winner of the event.

References

Pickens 200
Pickens 200
NASCAR races at Greenville-Pickens Speedway